The 2006 Mountain West Conference men's basketball tournament was played at Pepsi Center in Denver, Colorado from March 7–11, 2006.  Regular season league champion San Diego State held off Wyoming, who were at the time the lowest seed to ever make the championship game (7th), 69–64 in overtime to claim the Mountain West Conference tournament title and the league's automatic bid to the NCAA Tournament. SDSU became the first school in the league's brief history to win multiple tournament titles (2002 & 2006)

With the expansion and addition of TCU to the Mountain West Conference at the start of the 2005–06 athletic year, the conference tournament format was revised to include a play-in game between the 8th and 9th place teams, with the winner advancing to play the regular season MWC champion in the quarterfinals.

It is, to date, the last MWC Tournament played in Denver.  In 2007 the tournament returned to the Thomas & Mack Center in Las Vegas, where it had previously been from 2000–2003.

Tournament Bracket 

Mountain West Conference men's basketball tournament
Tournament
Mountain West Conference men's basketball tournament
Mountain West Conference men's basketball tournament
Basketball competitions in Denver
College sports tournaments in Colorado